John Thornden (or Thornton) was an English 16th-century Vice-Chancellor of the University of Oxford, and became a suffragan bishop. 

Thornden was a Doctor of Divinity. Thornden was appointed Vice-Chancellor of Oxford University several times from 1503 onwards. He was also a suffragan bishop to the Archbishop of Canterbury, William Warham.

References

Bibliography
 

Year of birth unknown
Year of death unknown
16th-century English Roman Catholic bishops
Suffragan bishops
Vice-Chancellors of the University of Oxford